RRB may refer to:

 The Indian Railway Recruitment Board
 The U.S. Railroad Retirement Board
 Regional Rural Banks, a type of financial institution in India